Synasponyssus is a genus of bat mites in the family Macronyssidae. There is at least one described species in Synasponyssus, S. wenzeli.

References

Mesostigmata
Articles created by Qbugbot
Acari genera